Birgit Hollmann (born 31 December 1973) is a German racing cyclist born in Berlin. She participates in both road cycling and cyclo-cross. In 2003, she became German national champion in cyclo-cross.

Honours

Road cycling
2006 : 1st in 2nd stage of Krasna Lipa Tour Féminine

Cyclo-cross
2002 : 2nd in German elite national championships
2003 : 3rd in Gieten
2003 : 1st in German elite national championships
2003 : 2nd in Herford
2004 : 2nd in Gieten
2004 : 2nd in German elite national championships
2005 : 2nd in Internationales Querfeldeinrennen
2005 : 2nd in Hamburg
2005 : 1st in Lebbeke
2005 : 3rd in Gieten
2006 : 3rd in Grand Prix du Nouvel-An
2006 : 2nd in German elite national championships
2006 : 1st in Berlin
2006 : 3rd in Treviso (2006/07 UCI Cyclo-cross World Cup)
2006 : 3rd in Pijnacker (2006/07 UCI Cyclo-cross World Cup)
2006 : 3rd in Overijse
2006 : 2nd in Hofstade (2006/07 UCI Cyclo-cross World Cup)

External links

1973 births
Living people
Cyclists from Berlin
German female cyclists
Cyclo-cross cyclists
20th-century German women
21st-century German women